Alexandra Marie Walsham  (born 4 January 1966) is an English-Australian academic historian. She specialises in early modern Britain and in the impact of the Protestant and Catholic reformations. Since 2010, she has been Professor of Modern History at the University of Cambridge and a Fellow of Trinity College, Cambridge. She is co-editor of Past & Present and Vice-President of the Royal Historical Society.

Early life and education
Walsham was born on 4 January 1966 in Hayle, Cornwall, and spent her early childhood in England. She and her family emigrated to Australia when she was young. She studied history with English at the University of Melbourne, graduating with a Bachelor of Arts (BA) degree and a Master of Arts (MA) degree. In 1990, she was awarded a Commonwealth Scholarship to study early modern history at the University of Cambridge. She undertook postgraduate research at Trinity College, Cambridge under the supervision of Patrick Collinson, the then Regius Professor of History. In 1995, she completed her Doctor of Philosophy (PhD) degree with a thesis titled Aspects of Providentialism in Early Modern England.

Academic career
Walsham began her academic career as a research fellow at Emmanuel College, Cambridge, between 1993 and 1996. In 1996, she moved to the University of Exeter where she was a lecturer in history. She was promoted to senior lecturer in 2000 and was granted a personal chair (professorship) in Reformation History in 2005. From 2007 to 2010, she served as Head of Department. In 2010, she returned to the University of Cambridge as Professor of Modern History and was elected a Fellow of Trinity College, Cambridge.

She is Vice President of the Royal Historical Society and Chair of its General Purposes Committee.  She is one of the series editors of the Cambridge Studies in Early Modern British History, and co-editor of Past & Present, an academic journal specialising in social history.

On 17 October 2013, she appeared on an episode of In Our Time to discuss the Book of Common Prayer. In February 2015, she gave the annual Bishop Van Mildert Lecture at the University of Durham; it was titled "Domesticating the Reformation: Material Culture, Memory and Confessional Identity in Early Modern England". She gave the Neale Lecture at University College London in October 2015. She has been elected to give the Ford Lectures at the University of Oxford in 2017/2018.

Honours
In 1999, Walsham was elected a Fellow of the Royal Historical Society (FRHistS). In 2009, she was elected a Fellow of the British Academy (FBA). In 2013, she was elected a Fellow of the Australian Academy of the Humanities (FAHA) and was President of the Ecclesiastical History Society (2012–13). She was appointed Commander of the Order of the British Empire (CBE) in the 2017 Birthday Honours for services to history.

In 2000, she was awarded the Longman-History Today Award and the American Historical Association’s Morris D. Forkosch Prize for her monograph Providence in Early Modern England. For her monograph The Reformation of the Landscape, she was awarded the Leo Gershoy Award in 2011 and the Wolfson History Prize in 2012.

Selected works

References

1966 births
20th-century Australian historians
20th-century Australian women writers
20th-century English women writers
20th-century English historians
21st-century Australian historians
21st-century Australian women writers
21st-century English women writers
21st-century English historians
Academics of the University of Exeter
Alumni of Trinity College, Cambridge
British women historians
Commanders of the Order of the British Empire
English emigrants to Australia
Fellows of Emmanuel College, Cambridge
Fellows of the Australian Academy of the Humanities
Fellows of the British Academy
Fellows of the Royal Historical Society
Fellows of Trinity College, Cambridge
Historians of Europe
Historians of the United Kingdom
Living people
Members of the University of Cambridge faculty of history
People from Hayle
Presidents of the Ecclesiastical History Society
Reformation historians
University of Melbourne alumni